Thomas A. Horlander is a retired United States Army lieutenant general who most recently served as the Military Deputy for Budget to the Assistant Secretary of the Army for Financial Management & Comptroller from August 2, 2017 to August 2021. Previously, he served as the Director for Army Budget of the Office of the Assistant Secretary of the Army for Financial Management & Comptroller.

Dates of rank

References

Living people
Place of birth missing (living people)
Recipients of the Defense Superior Service Medal
Recipients of the Distinguished Service Medal (US Army)
Recipients of the Legion of Merit
United States Army generals
United States Army personnel of the Gulf War
Year of birth missing (living people)